Lee Charlotte Lee (July 19, 1935 – April 30, 2006) was a Chinese American psychologist. She was a Professor Emerita of Human Development in the College of Human Ecology at Cornell University. Lee was the first woman of Asian ancestry to become a tenured professor at Cornell.

Biography 
Lee was born in Suzhou, China, in 1935. She attended Mount Union College, in Ohio, on a full scholarship. She graduated with a Bachelor of Arts degree in psychology and mathematics in 1957. She went on to attend Ohio State University, completing a Master's degree in clinical psychology in 1959 and a Ph.D. in developmental psychology in 1968.

Lee joined the faculty at Cornell University in 1968, becoming the institution's first woman professor of Asian ancestry. In 1987, she became the founding director of Cornell's Asian American Studies Program. At Cornell, Lee taught courses and conducted research in developmental psychology and in Asian-American identity and history.

With Nolan W. Zane, she was the co-editor of the first edition of The Handbook of Asian American Psychology, published in 1998.

While a Fulbright scholar at the Chinese University of Hong Kong from 1992 through 1994, Lee became the founding director of the Hong Kong-American Center. The mission of the Center is to promote cross-cultural understanding between Hong Kong and American communities.

Lee retired from Cornell in 2004.

In 2006, she died at her home in Ithaca, New York, at the age of 70.

Selected works

References 

1935 births
2006 deaths
Cornell University faculty
American developmental psychologists
20th-century American psychologists
American women psychologists
University of Mount Union alumni
Educators from Suzhou
Chinese psychologists
Chinese women psychologists
Chinese emigrants to the United States
Ohio State University alumni
20th-century American women
American women academics
21st-century American women